The Orissa razorbelly minnow (Salmophasia orissaensis) is a species of cyprinid fish in the genus Salmophasia.

References 

 

Salmostoma
Fish described in 1968
Taxa named by Petre Mihai Bănărescu